Akitsushima (PLH-32) is a Akitsushima-class patrol vessel currently operated by the Japanese Coast Guard.

Design 

This vessel is an enlarged and updated version of the earlier Shikishima. Aviation facilities have also been enhanced: whereas Shikishima is carrying Eurocopter AS332 helicopters, this vessel is able to carry the larger EC225LP Super Puma.

Weapons have also been updated and enhanced. As for the large calibre autocanon, the vessel is equipped with two single-mounted Bofors L/70 40 mm guns, as opposed to the double-mounted Oerlikon L/90 35mm guns of the Shikishima. These autocanons are the same as those carried by the Aso-class and Hida-class, and are capable of precision firing with an optical director. The JM61 20 mm guns are also upgraded to the production version as the other vessels, while the Shikishima is equipped with the earlier prototypes.

Construction and career 
Akitsushima was laid down on 10 May 2011 and launched on 4 July 2012 by IHI, Tokyo. She was commissioned on 28 November 2013.

Slopes and handrails were set up so that both elderly Majesties could get on board comfortably.

Gallery

References

Bibliography
 
 

Shikishima-class patrol vessels
2012 ships
Ships built by IHI Corporation